Closeup is an album by Frankie Valli, released in February 1975 on the Private Stock label.  It had been seven years since his prior album, and afforded Valli his first of two number-one solo hits in the US (in addition to five as lead singer of The Four Seasons).  The LP reached number 51 on the U.S. Billboard albums chart.

The album contains two hit singles:  "My Eyes Adored You" (US No. 1) and "Swearin' to God" (US No. 6). It also contains Valli's original version of "I Can't Live a Dream," which became a hit for the Osmond Brothers in late 1976.

Reception
In a retrospective review, Joe Viglione of AllMusic recalled that the album "is singer Frankie Valli again finding the magic without his Four Seasons, this time in the '70s with two big hits in two different genres", and called it "an important and forgotten catalog item that needs to be expanded and re-released with bonus tracks and liner notes that give it its proper place in music history."

In his August 1975 review for Stereo Review magazine, Peter Reilly remarked that:

Track listing
Side one 
"I Got Love for You, Ruby" (Sandy Linzer) - 3:22
"Why" (Bob Gaudio, Judy Parker) - 2:44
"He Sure Blessed You" (Bob Gaudio, Judy Parker) - 3:27
"Waking Up to Love" (Bob Crewe, Kenny Nolan) - 4:30
"I Can't Live a Dream" (Arnold Capitanelli) - 3:15

Side two 
"My Eyes Adored You" (Bob Crewe, Kenny Nolan) - 3:33
"In My Eyes" (Bob Crewe, Kenny Nolan) - 4:21
"Swearin' to God" (Bob Crewe, Denny Randell) - 10:09

Personnel
Frankie Valli - vocals
Bob Mann, Cliff Morris, Elliott Randall, Eric Weissberg, Jeff Mironov, Jerry Friedman, Larry Carlton, Mike Deasy, Neil LeVang - guitar
Chuck Rainey, Gordon Edwards - bass
Ken Asher, Michel Rubini - piano
Jim Keltner, Rick Marotta, Ronnie Zito - drums
Jimmy Maelen, Victor Feldman - percussion
Miss Bobbye Hall - congas
Carl Caldwell, Carolyn Willis, Clydie King, Jackie Ward, Jo Armstead, Marti McCall, Patti Austin, Tasha Thomas - backing vocals
Dave Tofani, George Young, Joe Farrell, Robert Keller - saxophone
Lew Del Gatto - baritone saxophone
Alan Rubin, Jon Faddis, Lew Soloff - trumpet
Meco Monardo, Wayne Andre - trombone
David Taylor - bass trombone
Margaret Ross - harp
George Ricci, Kermit Moore - cello
Charles Veal Jr., Emanuel Green, Harold Kohon, Harry Cykman, Henry Roth, Jack Shulman, Jesse Ehrlich, Marshall Sosson, Max Ellen, Max Pollikoff, Peter Dimitriades, Shirley Cornell, William Hymanson - violin
Charlie Calello - arrangements
Technical
Michael DeLugg, Val Garay - engineer
Joel Brodsky - photography

Charts

References

1975 albums
Frankie Valli albums
Private Stock Records albums
Albums produced by Bob Gaudio
Albums produced by Bob Crewe
albums arranged by Charles Calello